Hanne Skartveit (born 13 April 1966) is a Norwegian journalist and political editor.

She was born in Oslo, and is the daughter of journalist, magazine editor and publisher Andreas Skartveit.

She has worked as journalist for the newspapers Arbeiderbladet and Verdens Gang. She was awarded a SKUP diploma (is a Norwegian journalism award)  in 1999. In 2012 she was awarded the Gullpennen prize ( a Norwegian literature prize) or (The Golden Pen) by the Riksmål Society.

References

External links
Skartveit, Hanne. "Norge i Kinas garn" [Norway in China's (fish-)net] (22 May 2021)
Skartveit, https://www.vg.no/podkast/vgtv/program/10041

1966 births
Living people
Journalists from Oslo
Verdens Gang people